Amanda Rachel Posey (born June 1965) is a British film producer, best known for her films An Education (2009) and Brooklyn (2015), produced with frequent collaborator Finola Dwyer. She is married to novelist and screenwriter Nick Hornby, with whom she has two sons.

Career
In 2015, Posey produced an historical drama film Brooklyn, starring Saoirse Ronan, directed by John Crowley based on the screenplay by Nick Hornby. She received an Academy Award nomination for the film for Best Picture at the 88th Academy Awards along with Finola Dwyer.

Selected filmography
 1997: Fever Pitch (producer)
 2004: The Open Doors (Short, executive producer)
 2005: Fever Pitch (producer)
 2009: An Education (producer)
 2012: Quartet (associate producer)
 2014: A Long Way Down (producer)
 2015: Brooklyn (producer)
 2016: Their Finest (producer)

References

External links
 

Living people
British film producers
British women film producers
Date of birth missing (living people)
Place of birth missing (living people)
1965 births